The 2018 US Open of Curling was held from December 31, 2017, to January 2, 2018.

Men

Teams

Playoffs

Women

Teams

Knockout brackets

A Event

B Event

C Event

Playoffs

References

External links

US Open
Curling in Minnesota
Curling US Open
Curling competitions in the United States